17 Squadron or 17th Squadron may refer to:
 No. 17 Squadron PAF, a unit of the Pakistan Air Force.
 No. 17 Squadron RNZAF, a unit of the New Zealand Royal Air Force
 No. 17 Squadron IAF, a unit of the Indian air force.
 17 Squadron SAAF, a unit of the South African Air Force
 No. XVII Squadron RAF, a unit of the United Kingdom Royal Air Force
 17th Reconnaissance Squadron (United States), a unit of the United States Air Force
 17th Airlift Squadron (United States), a unit of the United States Air Force
 17th Operational Weather Squadron (United States), a unit of the United States Air Force

See also
 17th Division (disambiguation)
 17th Brigade (disambiguation)
 17th Regiment (disambiguation)